This is a list of India's bridges longer than , sorted by their full length above water.

Bridges

See also
List of longest bridges in the world
List of road–rail bridges
List of bridges in India
List of longest bridges in West Bengal

References

Length
Bridges
Bridges
Lists of construction records
Indian superlatives
Bridges in India by river
Bridges, India